Pieve Torina is a comune (municipality) in the Province of Macerata in the Italian region Marche, located about  southwest of Ancona and about  southwest of Macerata. Among the churches in the area are:
Chiesa della Madonna di Monte Aguzzo.
Santa Maria Assunta parish church.

References

Cities and towns in the Marche